Jardine is a rural locality in the Livingstone Shire, Queensland, Australia. In the  Jardine had a population of 59 people.

Geography 
The locality is bounded by Alligator Creek to the west, by Bills Creek to the north and Hedlow Creek.

The predominant land use is grazing on native vegetation with some cropping.

History 
The locality was most likely named after pastoralist and magistrate John Jardine of Rockhampton.

Jardine Provisional School opened  on 11 August 1913. On 1 December 1914 it became Jardine State School. Circa 1935 it was renamed Milman State School.

In the  Jardine had a population of 59 people.

Education 
There are no schools in present-day Jardine. The nearest primary school is Milman State School in neighbouring Milman to the south-east. The nearest secondary school is Glenmore State High School in Kawana, a northern suburb of Rockhampton, to the south.

References 

Shire of Livingstone
Localities in Queensland